Polymorphic Code is the debut studio album by French one-man band The Algorithm, signed by Basick Records and released on November 19, 2012. Music video for the song Trojans was released on November 7, 2012.

Track listing

Personnel
 Rémi Gallego — synthesizer, sequencer, guitar, programming, producer
 Tim Reynolds - mastering

References

2012 debut albums
The Algorithm albums
Albums produced by Rémi Gallego
Basick Records albums